Helmut Pankratz (born October 10, 1937) is a Canadian retired politician in Manitoba, Canada.  Pankratz served as mayor of Steinbach from 1981 to 1986. From 1986 to 1990, he represented the electoral district of La Verendrye for the Progressive Conservative Party in the Legislative Assembly of Manitoba.

He was born to a Mennonite family in Winnipeg, Manitoba. His parents were Henry and Justina Pankratz. Before entering politics, he worked as a farmer. On August 24, 1961, he married Dolores Jean and had two children with her: Kevin Blair and Jillayne Fay.

Pankratz was first elected to the Manitoba legislature in the provincial election of 1986, defeating Walter McDowell of the NDP by almost 2,000 votes. In the 1988 election, he defeated Liberal C.E. Goertzen by over 1,400 votes as the Progressive Conservatives formed a minority government under Gary Filmon.

Pankratz was not appointed to cabinet, but served as Chairman of the Standing Committee on Economic Development. He retired from the legislature in 1990, and has not returned to political life since this time. He now owns a recreational vehicle dealership in the Steinbach area.

References

Progressive Conservative Party of Manitoba MLAs
1937 births
Living people
People from Steinbach, Manitoba
Politicians from Winnipeg
Canadian Mennonites